Miguel Ángel López Moreno (born February 4, 1994) is a Colombian cyclist, who currently rides for UCI Continental team .

In 2016, López won his first World Tour stage race at the Tour de Suisse and achieved his maiden grand tour stage victory the following season on Stage 11 of the Vuelta a España, followed by another victory on Stage 15. He was the overall winner of the Tour Colombia and the Volta a Catalunya in 2019. In 2020, he won the "Queen" stage of the Tour de France.

Career
López was born in Pesca. López celebrated success in 2014, winning multiple stage races while still an amateur. In August he won the Tour de l'Avenir, the most prestigious under 23 cycling race. López also won the U23 version of the Vuelta a Colombia.

Astana (2015–20)

2015
His success in stage races continued, finishing 4th overall and winning a stage at the Vuelta a Burgos and 7th overall in the Tour de Suisse.

2016
2016 was López's breakthrough season. He finished 4th in the Tour de San Luis, the first race of his season, winning Stage 6 and taking the young rider classification. One month later, López finished third and won a stage at the Tour de Langkawi, an eight-day race held in Malaysia. The biggest win yet of his career came at the Tour de Suisse, where he won the general classification ahead of Ion Izagirre and Warren Barguil. Following these successes, López was one of five riders selected to represent Colombia in the road race at the Olympics. López started his first grand tour at the Vuelta a España where he was the chosen team leader but he was forced to abandon the race on Stage 6 following a crash on Stage 3.

2017
López was named on the start list for the Vuelta a España in a strong Astana line-up alongside former race winner Fabio Aru. On Stage 11, he took his first grand tour stage victory, distancing himself from race favourites Chris Froome, Vincenzo Nibali and Wilco Kelderman in the last  of the first-category climb up to the Calar Alto Observatory. López's fine form in the mountains continued on Stage 14 to Sierra de la Pandera where he once again distanced the race leaders to finish second to Rafał Majka on the first especial category climb of the race. He went on to win the following Stage 15 after a solo escape on the summit finish, yet again distancing the race favorites for his second Vuelta stage victory.

2018
In May 2018, he was named in the startlist for the Giro d'Italia; he finished in third place overall, behind Chris Froome and Tom Dumoulin. He also made the podium in the Vuelta a España, finishing third overall behind Simon Yates and Enric Mas.

2019

López won stage 4 and the general classification in March's Volta a Catalunya. López competed in the Giro d'Italia, finishing seventh overall and winning the young rider classification for a second time in a row. He proceeded to hit the spectator four times, including knocking the hat off his head. While the regulations of the sport's governing body, the Union Cycliste Internationale (UCI), call for disqualification of a rider who assaults someone during a race, the race jury decided against applying a punishment to López. He later apologised for the incident, but stated that riders should receive more respect from the crowd. One day later, after the Giro had ended, the UCI announced that they were investigating the lack of a penalty for his behaviour.

2020
In August 2020, he was named in the startlist for the Tour de France. López won stage 17, the queen stage, finishing atop the Col de la Loze. Near the end of the stage and at the steepest part of the climb – reaching gradients of up to 24% – López and Sepp Kuss caught the final breakaway rider Richard Carapaz. Kuss waited up for his leader Primož Roglič and López soloed to victory ahead of him and Tadej Pogačar, and moved into third in the general classification – a position that he was hoping to keep for the rest of the race. He held that position until the penultimate day, when he lost three or more minutes to the three riders immediately behind him in the overall standings, dropping to a final position of sixth.

Movistar Team
In August, the  extended his contract to the end of 2023. During the Vuelta a España he finished second of the overall contenders in the first summit finish, on the third stage, at Picón Blanco. He ran as high as third overall in the first half of the race, trailing Primož Roglič, and teammate Enric Mas. He once again won the queen stage of a Grand Tour, winning the eighteenth stage that finished at El Gamoniteiru, the highest mountain in the autonomous community of Asturias. López attacked with  remaining and chased down the sole leader David de la Cruz; he ultimately won the stage by fourteen seconds from Roglič. During the penultimate stage, he missed a move among the other general classification contenders and found himself stuck in a group that had fallen behind. López abandoned the race a few kilometres later despite several team members encouraging him to continue. López later apologised for the manner of his withdrawal, but two weeks later, López and  agreed to a mutual termination of his contract as at the end of the month. He later described Mas as a "selfish person" and the team atmosphere was "always very tense". The incident featured as part of the third season of The Least Expected Day, a documentary series about the team.

Return to Astana
In October 2021, López signed a two-year contract with the  team, later renamed , from the 2022 season. He finished third overall at the Vuelta a Andalucía, and took his first victory of the season at the Tour of the Alps, winning the penultimate stage that finished at the Grossglockner.

As the end of the 2022 Tour de France neared Lopez, who was not in the race this year, was stopped by police at a Madrid airport and questioned in a non blood doping drug trafficking investigation. Team Astana Qazaqstan issued a very surprised tweet on July 22, 04:02 that Lopez had been suspended by the team until a clarification was made regarding a Spanish professor he has had contact with. Initial reports that López himself was being investigated were denied by Spain's Guardia Civil police force.
As of 12 December, 2022 López's contract with Team Astana Qazaqstan was terminated.

Major results

2014
 1st  Overall Tour de l'Avenir
1st  Mountains classification
1st Stage 6
 1st  Overall Vuelta de la Juventud de Colombia
1st Stage 4
 1st  Overall Clásica de Samacá
1st Stages 1 & 2
 1st  Overall Clásica Aguazul
1st Stages 1 & 2
 1st Stage 1 Clásica Fusagasugá
 4th Time trial, National Under-23 Road Championships
2015
 4th Overall Vuelta a Burgos
1st  Young rider classification
1st Stages 2 (TTT) & 4
 7th Overall Tour de Suisse
2016
 1st  Overall Tour de Suisse
 1st Milano–Torino
 3rd Overall Tour de Langkawi
1st Stage 4
 4th Time trial, National Road Championships
 4th Overall Tour de San Luis
1st  Young rider classification
1st Stage 6
2017
 2nd Overall Tour of Austria
1st Stage 4
 4th Overall Vuelta a Burgos
1st Stage 5
 8th Overall Vuelta a España
1st  Young rider classification
1st Stages 11 & 15
2018
 2nd Overall Vuelta a Burgos
1st  Points classification
1st Stage 3
 2nd Overall Tour of Oman
1st  Young rider classification
1st Stage 5
 2nd Milano–Torino
 3rd Overall Giro d'Italia
1st  Young rider classification
 3rd Overall Vuelta a España
 3rd Overall Abu Dhabi Tour
1st  Young rider classification
 3rd Overall Tour of the Alps
1st Stage 2
2019
 1st  Overall Volta a Catalunya
1st  Young rider classification
1st Stage 4
 1st  Overall Tour Colombia
1st  Young rider classification
 2nd Time trial, National Road Championships
 5th Overall Vuelta a España
1st Stage 1 (TTT)
 Combativity award Stage 1 & Overall
Held  after Stages 1, 5 & 7
Held  after Stages 1–12 & 18–19
 7th Overall Giro d'Italia
1st  Young rider classification
2020
 3rd Overall Volta ao Algarve
1st Stage 4
 5th Overall Critérium du Dauphiné
 6th Overall Tour de France
1st Stage 17
2021
 1st  Overall Vuelta a Andalucía
1st Stage 3
 1st Mont Ventoux Dénivelé Challenge
 1st Stage 18 Vuelta a España
 6th Overall Critérium du Dauphiné
2022
 1st Stage 4 Tour of the Alps
 3rd Overall Vuelta a Burgos
1st  Mountains classification
 3rd Overall Vuelta a Andalucía
 4th Overall Vuelta a España
 4th Giro del Veneto
2023
 1st  Time trial, National Road Championships
 1st  Overall Vuelta a San Juan
1st Stage 5

General classification results timeline

References

External links

 
 
 
 
 
 
 

1994 births
Living people
Colombian male cyclists
Olympic cyclists of Colombia
Cyclists at the 2016 Summer Olympics
Colombian Vuelta a España stage winners
Colombian Tour de France stage winners
Sportspeople from Boyacá Department
21st-century Colombian people